Mike Wolfs (born 2 September 1970 in Port Credit, Ontario) is a Canadian sailor.
He won a silver medal with Ross MacDonald at the 2004 Summer Olympics in the men's Star event.

References
 

1970 births
Living people
Canadian male sailors (sport)
Olympic sailors of Canada
Olympic silver medalists for Canada
Olympic medalists in sailing
Sailors at the 2004 Summer Olympics – Star
Pan American Games bronze medalists for Canada
Sailors at the 2007 Pan American Games
Sportspeople from Mississauga
Medalists at the 2004 Summer Olympics
Pan American Games medalists in sailing
Medalists at the 2007 Pan American Games